The Port of Zamboanga (Chavacano: Puerto de Zamboanga) and (Cebuano: Pantalan sa Zamboanga) is a seaport located in Zamboanga City, Philippines. It is managed by the Philippine Ports Authority, Port Management Office-Zamboanga,  (PPA, PMO-Zamboanga), otherwise known by its corporate name, Zamboanga Freeport Authority (ZFA). The facility ranked second in Asia under the Super Efficient Ports in Asia study carried out in 2010 and published in the African Journal of Business Management (Vol. 5(4), pp. 1397–1407) on February 18, 2011.

Facilities
The Port of Zamboanga is a center for sardine exports to the United States, Europe, the Middle, and Far East. 25 shipping lines operate via the port, serviced by four shipyards operating within the port boundaries and in Zamboanga City.

The port has 19 docks, 12 of which are privately owned. The largest dock has capacity for up to 20 vessels, and is operated directly by the Philippine Ports Authority.

Passenger transport is also a major port industry, with an annual passenger throughput exceeding 5.5 million.

Statistics

Gallery

See also
 Port of Davao

References

External links
 Zamboanga International Seaport

Zamboanga Port
Buildings and structures in Zamboanga City
Transportation in Mindanao